Eric Iljans (born 1969) is a Swedish freestyle skier. He represented Sweden at the 2010 Winter Olympics in Vancouver, where he competed in ski cross.

He is married to Magdalena Iljans.

References

1969 births
Swedish male freestyle skiers
Olympic freestyle skiers of Sweden
Freestyle skiers at the 2010 Winter Olympics
Living people